The Kune Falls is a waterfall at Lonavla in Pune district in the Indian state of Maharashtra. It is the 14th highest waterfall in India.

The falls

See also
List of waterfalls in India
List of waterfalls in India by height

References

External links 
 Some Kune Waterfalls Pictures

Waterfalls of Maharashtra
Geography of Pune district
Tourist attractions in Pune district
Lonavala-Khandala